Sean Gannon (born 11 July 1991) is an Irish professional footballer who plays as a defender for  Shamrock Rovers in the League of Ireland Premier Division. He previously played for St Patrick's Athletic and Dundalk and has won nine league winner's medals in his career so far. Gannon has featured regularly in European competition for Dundalk and was part of their team that became only the second Irish side ever to reach the group stage of the UEFA Europa League in August 2016.

Early life
Gannon grew up in Ringsend and regularly attended Republic of Ireland matches with his father at the nearby Lansdowne Road. He was a ball boy in several games, most notably a 1–1 draw with Portugal in the 2002 World Cup qualifiers. In his teenage years, Gannon played for schoolboy clubs Cambridge Boys Home Farm FC and St. Kevin's Boys, before signing for Shamrock Rovers in the summer of 2010. He played in the club's A Championship team and was part of their under-20s title-winning side under Andrew Myler. While appearing for the Shamrock Rovers youth teams, Gannon successfully graduated from a joint FÁS/FAI Youth Soccer Training course in Irishtown Stadium, giving him exposure to a year of full-time training and preparing him for professional football.

Professional career

Shamrock Rovers
Gannon made his senior debut for Shamrock Rovers in February 2011, coming on as a half-time substitute for Craig Sives in a Leinster Senior Cup game away to Dundalk. His league debut came on 12 September when he started in a 1–1 draw with St Patrick's Athletic, his only league appearance of the 2011 season. Gannon was part of the Shamrock Rovers squad that became the first ever Irish side to reach the group stage of European competition when they knocked out Partizan Belgrade in the Europa League 4th qualifying round, however he made no appearances in qualifying and was cut from the 25-man squad for the group stage.

In 2012, Gannon moved closer to the Shamrock Rovers first team, making 8 league appearances and playing in 7 cup games, where he was mostly deployed as a right-back. He was part of the Shamrock Rovers team that won the Leinster Senior Cup and scored three times for the club in cup competition. At the end of the season he was released by new manager Trevor Croly.

St Patrick's Athletic
Gannon signed for Liam Buckley at St Patrick's Athletic on 27 November 2012. He played 13 league games for St Pat's as they went on to win the 2013 League of Ireland Premier Division, featuring mostly as a central midfielder. Although Gannon was kept from playing in his favoured position by right-back Ger O'Brien, he later stated that he learned a lot from the experience of playing in the same team as him.

Dundalk
On 6 November 2013, Gannon linked back up with his former Shamrock Rovers manager Stephen Kenny at Dundalk, becoming Kenny's first new signing for the 2014 season. In his first season at the club, he was part of a defence that kept sixteen clean sheets on their way to winning the league title on the final day of the season. Gannon played in all thirty-three league games and scored two goals in wins over Drogheda United and his former club, St. Patrick's Athletic. His goal against the latter included a 36-pass build-up involving all ten outfield players and was widely regarded as one of the league's goals of the season. Gannon also won the League Cup appearing in a 3–2 defeat of Shamrock Rovers in the final and made his European debut in July 2014 against Jeunesse Esch. Gannon's reliability, willingness to attack, and form over the course of the season earned him comparison to former Manchester United full-back Denis Irwin and also a place in the PFAI Premier Division Team of the Year. After the season ended, Gannon turned down the opportunity to go on trial to Millwall in favour of signing a new contract with Dundalk.

The following season, Gannon appeared in all but one of Dundalk's Premier Division matches as they retained their league title, scoring once in a 2–0 win over Shamrock Rovers. He played in both UEFA Champions League second qualifying round games as Dundalk were eliminated by BATE Borisov. Gannon also won the FAI Cup, going off injured with an ankle ligament injury in the 43rd minute of the final. He celebrated the winning goal by limping down the touchline on crutches and waving them in the air towards the fans. Following the end of the season, he was again rewarded with a place in the PFAI Team of the Year for the second year in-a-row.

Gannon returned from his injury to appear in all 6 of Dundalk's UEFA Champions League qualifier games in 2016 as they became the first ever Irish side to reach the play-off round. Gannon received significant exposure due to this achievement, appearing on The 7 O'Clock Show on TV3 and RTÉ's Saturday Night with Miriam in August 2016. He regards the European qualifying games as the stage where League of Ireland players are truly judged, and considers the third qualifying round victory over BATE Borisov as the highlight of his career to date. 2017 was a more challenging year for Dundalk with rivals Cork City doing the League and FAI Cup double. Gannon signed a new three-year contract with Dundalk in November 2017, and was a key part of the team that retained the league title in 2018. He was also voted onto the PFAI Team of the Year for the fifth year in a row.

Career statistics
Professional appearances – correct as of 1 September 2022.

Honours

Club
Shamrock Rovers
League of Ireland Premier Division (3): 2011, 2021,  2022
President of Ireland's Cup (1): 2022
Leinster Senior Cup (1): 2012

St Patrick's Athletic
League of Ireland Premier Division (1): 2013

Dundalk
League of Ireland Premier Division (5): 2014, 2015, 2016, 2018, 2019
FAI Cup (3): 2015, 2018, 2020
League of Ireland Cup (3): 2014, 2017, 2019
President of Ireland's Cup (2): 2015, 2019
Leinster Senior Cup (1): 2015
Champions Cup (1): 2019

Individual
PFAI Team of the Year (6): 2014, 2015, 2016, 2017, 2018, 2019

References

External links
FAI Stats Portal Profile

Republic of Ireland association footballers
1991 births
Living people
Shamrock Rovers F.C. players
St Patrick's Athletic F.C. players
Dundalk F.C. players
League of Ireland players
Association footballers from County Dublin
A Championship players
Association football fullbacks